Daniel Harrison (born 15 April 1988) is an Australian rugby league footballer who plays for the Hills District Bulls in the Ron Massey Cup.

He previously played for the Manly-Warringah Sea Eagles and the Parramatta Eels in the NRL.  He also played for the London Broncos in the Betfred Championship.

Rugby league career

2011-12: Career with Manly
Harrison is a former Manly junior who returned to the club in 2011 after several seasons with Canterbury-Bankstown. He made his debut game in round 2 2011 against the Sydney Roosters, a game the Manly club won 27–16. In 2012, Harrison signed with the Parramatta Eels for two-years until 2014, starting in 2013.

2013-14: Career with Parramatta
In June 2013, Harrison was one of 12 Parramatta players that were told that their futures at the club were uncertain by coach, Ricky Stuart. Despite being told that he may need to look for a new club in 2014, Harrison made his debut for Parramatta in Round 15 against the South Sydney Rabbitohs but due to Ricky Stuart leaving he was able to stay.  He played seven games for Parramatta in the 2013 NRL season as the club finished last on the table.

In March 2014, Harrison was released by Parramatta. In the wake of the 2016 salary cap scandal, it was revealed that Harrison was still being paid money owed to him by Parramatta even though he left the club two years earlier.

2015-2018: Career with London
On 18 July 2014, Championship side London Broncos announced the signing of Harrison on a 2-year deal until the end of 2016.

In 2018, Harrison played in his 100th professional game with the round 1 victory over the Barrow Raiders.

Hills District
At the start of 2021, it was reported that Harrison had signed a contract with Ron Massey Cup side Hills District Bulls.

References

External links

London Broncos profile
MWSE player profile

1988 births
Living people
Australian rugby league players
Manly Warringah Sea Eagles players
Parramatta Eels players
Wentworthville Magpies players
Rugby league locks
Rugby league second-rows
Rugby league players from Gosford, New South Wales